Hemipsilichthys gobio is a species of catfish in the family Loricariidae. It is native to the Paraíba do Sul basin of Brazil. It is found in small, clear rivers with moderate to strong currents and rocky substrates. It reaches 15.6 cm (6.1 inches) SL.

References 

Loricariidae
Fish described in 1874